Frank Sandon (3 June 1890 – 29 May 1979) was a British swimmer. He competed in the men's 100 metre backstroke event at the 1912 Summer Olympics.

Sandon studied mathematics at Corpus Christi College, Cambridge finishing as a Wrangler. He joined the Home office but found he was 'too remote from real people' so changed to teaching after World War I. He taught at Highgate School from 1921-1923 and at various grammar schools, becoming headmaster of Plymouth Corporation Grammar School, founded in 1562, for eight years until its closure in 1937. A strong believer in co-education, in 1941 Sandon was appointed headmaster of Millom County Secondary School in Millom, Cumberland. He wrote or contributed to numerous books on statistics.

References

1890 births
1979 deaths
Alumni of Corpus Christi College, Cambridge
British statisticians
British male swimmers
Olympic swimmers of Great Britain
Swimmers at the 1912 Summer Olympics
People from Islington (district)
Sportspeople from London
British male backstroke swimmers